Patrizia Webley (born and sometimes credited as Patrizia De Rossi, 1 December 1950) is an Italian actress. She acted mainly in horror films and erotic films.

Career 
She began her career as an actress in Italian erotic comedies in 1975 with the film Gli angeli dalle mani bendate with Rossano Brazzi, later she participated in films such as The Bloodsucker Leads the Dance, Movie rush - La febbre del cinema (it), Ragazza alla pari, and Classe mista, among others. She also makes an appearance in Salon Kitty. Since the early eighties she retired from acting, her last appearance dates from 1981 with the miniseries Seagull Island (it).

Filmography

References

External links 
 

1950 births
Living people
20th-century Italian actresses
Italian film actresses
Actresses from Rome